William Sydney Hurd (10 September 1908 – May 1992) was an English cricketer. Hurd's batting and bowling styles are unknown. He was born at Ashby-de-la-Zouch, Leicestershire.

Hurd made his first-class debut for Leicestershire against Kent in the 1932 County Championship. He made two further first-class appearances for the county, against Oxford University in 1932 and Worcestershire in the 1934 County Championship. He scored just 7 runs in his three matches, at an average of 1.75, with a high score of 5.

He died at Abingdon, Oxfordshire, in May 1992.

References

External links
William Hurd at ESPNcricinfo
William Hurd at CricketArchive

1908 births
1992 deaths
People from Ashby-de-la-Zouch
Cricketers from Leicestershire
English cricketers
Leicestershire cricketers